Nassarius crenulatus is a species of sea snail, a marine gastropod mollusc in the family Nassariidae, the Nassa mud snails or dog whelks.

This species name has become a nomen dubium.

Description
The shell grows to a length of 32 mm.

Distribution
This species occurs in the Red Sea, in the Indian Ocean off Madagascar and Tanzania; off Taiwan.

References

 Lamarck, J. B. de. 1816. Tableau encyclopédique et méthodique des trois règnes de la Nature. Paris. 
 Dautzenberg, Ph. (1929). Contribution à l'étude de la faune de Madagascar: Mollusca marina testacea. Faune des colonies françaises, III(fasc. 4). Société d'Editions géographiques, maritimes et coloniales: Paris. 321–636, plates IV-VII pp. page(s): 408 
 Spry, J.F. (1961). The sea shells of Dar es Salaam: Gastropods. Tanganyika Notes and Records 56

External links
 

Nassariidae
Gastropods described in 1816